D-lactate dehydratase (glyoxylase III) is an enzyme with systematic name (R)-lactate hydro-lyase. This enzyme catalyses the following chemical reaction

 (R)-lactate  methylglyoxal + H2O

The enzyme converts methylglyoxal to (R)-lactate.

References

External links 
 

EC 4.2.1